The list of ship commissionings in 2014 includes a chronological list of all ships commissioned in 2014.


See also

2014